Ana Maria Țicu (née Apipie; born 23 February 1992) is a Romanian handballer for SCM Craiova and the Romanian national team.

She represented Romania at the 2020 European Women's Handball Championship.

She was given the award of Cetățean de onoare ("Honorary Citizen") of the city of Craiova in 2018.

International honours
EHF Cup: 
Winner: 2018

References

External links

Profile on SCM Craiova official website

1992 births
Living people
Sportspeople from Râmnicu Vâlcea
Romanian female handball players